Darvand-e Sartang (also Romanized as Dārvand-e Sartang; also known as Sar Tang and Sar Tang-e ‘Olyā) is a village in Kalan Rural District, Zarneh District, Eyvan County, Ilam Province, Iran. At the 2006 census, its population was 298, in 65 families. The village is populated by Kurds.

References 

Populated places in Eyvan County
Kurdish settlements in Ilam Province